Jawahar Navodaya Vidyalaya, Ahmednagar is a CBSE affiliated school located in Ahmednagar district of Maharashtra  state in India. It is a part of the Jawahar Navodaya Vidyalaya system of alternate schools for gifted students in India.

See also
 Jawahar Navodaya Vidyalaya
 Jawahar Navodaya Vidyalaya, Wardha

References

Jawahar Navodaya Vidyalayas in Maharashtra
Boarding schools in Maharashtra
Education in Ahmednagar district
Educational institutions established in 1987
1987 establishments in Maharashtra